Borneophysis is a genus of beetles in the family Cerambycidae, and the only species in the genus is Borneophysis chewi. It was described by Vives and Heffern in 2006.

References

Dorcasominae
Beetles described in 2006
Monotypic Cerambycidae genera